A total of 10 teams competed in the 2011–12 Nepal National League. The season began on 30 December 2011 and concluded on 22 January 2012.

Nepal Police Club won the league.

League table

Top scorers

References

External links
Season on soccerway.com

Nepal National League seasons
1
1